KAQU-LP (88.1 FM) was a non-commercial low power FM radio station in Sitka, Alaska. The station aired the live recordings of whale sounds using a microphone placed 80 to 90 feet below the surface of the water in the eastern channel located in Sitka at Whale Park. KAQU-LP's license was returned to the Federal Communications Commission (FCC) by the licensee on October 18, 2013, and cancelled by the FCC on October 22, 2013.

External links
 
 Press Release for KAQU
 Arcane Radio Trivia article on KAQU-LP

2013 disestablishments in Alaska
Defunct radio stations in the United States
AQU-LP
Radio stations disestablished in 2013
Sitka, Alaska

AQU-LP
AQU-LP